Martinci Railway station is a railway station on Belgrade–Šid railway. Located in Martinci, Sremska Mitrovica, Serbia. Railroad continued to Kukujevci-Erdevik on one end. On the other end railroad went to Laćarak following with Sremska Mitrovica. Martinci railway station consists of 5 railway track. 

This railway station has been closed for may years and the station itself is more of a attraction or place to visit when in Martinci.

See also 
 Serbian Railways

References 

Sremska Mitrovica
Railway stations in Vojvodina